Mar Mostro is a Volvo Open 70 yacht. She finished third in the 2011–12 Volvo Ocean Race skippered by Ken Read.

References

Volvo Ocean Race yachts
Volvo Open 70 yachts
Sailing yachts of the United States